Bernard Corboz (2 April 1948 – 24 September 2013) was a Swiss judge who served as the vice-president of the Federal Supreme Court of Switzerland from 2005 to 2006.

Corboz was elected to the Supreme Court in 1988.

References

External links
Official biography

1948 births
Place of birth missing
2013 deaths
Place of death missing
Federal Supreme Court of Switzerland judges
20th-century Swiss judges